Kiosk is a small enclosed structure, often freestanding, open on one or both sides or with a window, used as a booth to sell newspapers, tobacco, coffee, food and drink, etc. or to dispense information.

Kiosk may also refer to:

Buildings
K67 kiosk, a kiosk design, designed in 1966 by the Slovenian architect and designer Saša J. Mächtig.
Interactive kiosks, such as automated teller machines.
Cleopatra's Kiosk a small building and shop, on the Victoria Embankment, London, under the Hungerford Bridge.

Business
KIOSK, an art, design and architecture magazine.
Kiosk (TV) was a Scandinavian pay-per-view service available on Canal Digital's satellite platform and owned by Canal+.

Music
Kiosk (band), an Iranian rock band

Places
Kiosk, Ontario a former community on Kioshkokwi Lake in northern Algonquin Park.

Technology
Interactive kiosk, a computer terminal that provides information access via electronic methods.
Kiosk hacking a practice of bypassing the security restrictions of kiosk software.
Kiosk software a system and user interface software designed for a kiosk or Internet kiosk.

es:Quiosco